Hard water is water that has high mineral content (in contrast with "soft water"). Hard water is formed when water percolates through deposits of limestone, chalk or gypsum, which are largely made up of calcium and magnesium carbonates, bicarbonates and sulfates.

Hard drinking water may have moderate health benefits. It can pose critical problems in industrial settings, where water hardness is monitored to avoid costly breakdowns in boilers, cooling towers, and other equipment that handles water. In domestic settings, hard water is often indicated by a lack of foam formation when soap is agitated in water, and by the formation of limescale in kettles and water heaters. Wherever water hardness is a concern, water softening is commonly used to reduce hard water's adverse effects.

Origins
Natural rainwater, snow and other forms of precipitation typically have low concentrations of multivalent cations such as calcium and magnesium. They may have small concentrations of ions such as sodium, chloride and sulfate derived from wind action over the sea. Where precipitation falls in drainage basins formed of hard, impervious and calcium-poor rocks, only very low concentrations of multivalent cations are found and the water is termed soft water. Examples include Snowdonia in Wales and the Western Highlands in Scotland.

Areas with complex geology can produce varying degrees of hardness of water over short distances.

Types

Permanent hardness
The permanent hardness of water  is determined by the concentration of multivalent cations in the water. Multivalent cations are positively charged metal complexes with a charge greater than 1+. Usually, the cations have the charge of 2+. Common cations found in hard water include Ca2+ and Mg2+. These ions enter a water supply by leaching from minerals within an aquifer. Common calcium-containing minerals are calcite and gypsum. A common magnesium mineral is dolomite (which also contains calcium). Rainwater and distilled water are soft, because they contain few ions.

The following equilibrium reaction describes the dissolving and formation of calcium carbonate and calcium bicarbonate (on the right):
CaCO3 (s) + CO2 (aq) + H2O (l)  Ca2+ (aq) + 2  (aq)

The reaction can go in either direction. Rain containing dissolved carbon dioxide can react with calcium carbonate and carry calcium ions away with it. The calcium carbonate may be re-deposited as calcite as the carbon dioxide is lost to atmosphere, sometimes forming stalactites and stalagmites.

Calcium and magnesium ions can sometimes be removed by water softeners.

Permanent hardness (mineral content) is generally difficult to remove by boiling. If this occurs, it is usually caused by the presence of calcium sulfate/calcium chloride and/or magnesium sulfate/magnesium chloride in the water, which do not precipitate out as the temperature increases. Ions causing permanent hardness of water can be removed using a water softener, or ion-exchange column.

Temporary hardness

Temporary hardness is caused by the presence of dissolved bicarbonate minerals (calcium bicarbonate and magnesium bicarbonate). When dissolved, these type of minerals yield calcium and magnesium cations (Ca2+, Mg2+) and carbonate and bicarbonate anions ( and ). The presence of the metal cations makes the water hard. However, unlike the permanent hardness caused by sulfate and chloride compounds, this "temporary" hardness can be reduced either by boiling the water, or by the addition of lime (calcium hydroxide) through the process of lime softening. Boiling promotes the formation of carbonate from the bicarbonate and precipitates calcium carbonate out of solution, leaving water that is softer upon cooling.

Effects
With hard water, soap solutions form a white precipitate (soap scum) instead of producing lather, because the 2+ ions destroy the surfactant properties of the soap by forming a solid precipitate (the soap scum). A major component of such scum is calcium stearate, which arises from sodium stearate, the main component of soap:
2 C17H35COO− (aq) + Ca2+ (aq) → (C17H35COO)2Ca (s)
Hardness can thus be defined as the soap-consuming capacity of a water sample, or the capacity of precipitation of soap as a characteristic property of water that prevents the lathering of soap. Synthetic detergents do not form such scums.

Because soft water has few calcium ions, there is no inhibition of the lathering action of soaps and no soap scum is formed in normal washing. Similarly, soft water produces no calcium deposits in water heating systems.

Hard water also forms deposits that clog plumbing. These deposits, called "scale", are composed mainly of calcium carbonate (CaCO3), magnesium hydroxide (Mg(OH)2), and calcium sulfate (CaSO4). Calcium and magnesium carbonates tend to be deposited as off-white solids on the inside surfaces of pipes and heat exchangers. This precipitation (formation of an insoluble solid) is principally caused by thermal decomposition of bicarbonate ions but also happens in cases where the carbonate ion is at saturation concentration. The resulting build-up of scale restricts the flow of water in pipes. In boilers, the deposits impair the flow of heat into water, reducing the heating efficiency and allowing the metal boiler components to overheat. In a pressurized system, this overheating can lead to failure of the boiler. The damage caused by calcium carbonate deposits varies on the crystalline form, for example, calcite or aragonite.

The presence of ions in an electrolyte, in this case, hard water, can also lead to galvanic corrosion, in which one metal will preferentially corrode when in contact with another type of metal, when both are in contact with an electrolyte. The softening of hard water by ion exchange does not increase its corrosivity per se. Similarly, where lead plumbing is in use, softened water does not substantially increase plumbo-solvency.

In swimming pools, hard water is manifested by a turbid, or cloudy (milky), appearance to the water. Calcium and magnesium hydroxides are both soluble in water. The solubility of the hydroxides of the alkaline-earth metals to which calcium and magnesium belong (group 2 of the periodic table) increases moving down the column. Aqueous solutions of these metal hydroxides absorb carbon dioxide from the air, forming the insoluble carbonates, giving rise to the turbidity.  This often results from the pH being excessively high (pH > 7.6). Hence, a common solution to the problem is, while maintaining the chlorine concentration at the proper level, to lower the pH by the addition of hydrochloric acid, the optimum value being in the range of 7.2 to 7.6.

Softening

It is often desirable to soften hard water. Most detergents contain ingredients that counteract the effects of hard water on the surfactants. For this reason, water softening is often unnecessary. Where softening is practised, it is often recommended to soften only the water sent to domestic hot water systems so as to prevent or delay inefficiencies and damage due to scale formation in water heaters. A common method for water softening involves the use of ion-exchange resins, which replace ions like Ca2+ by twice the number of mono cations such as sodium or potassium ions.

Washing soda (sodium carbonate, Na2CO3) is easily obtained and has long been used as a water softener for domestic laundry, in conjunction with the usual soap or detergent.

Water that has been treated by a water softening may be termed softened water. In these cases the water may also contain elevated levels of sodium or potassium and bicarbonate or chloride ions.

Health considerations
The World Health Organization says that "there does not appear to be any convincing evidence that water hardness causes adverse health effects in humans". In fact, the United States National Research Council has found that hard water actually serves as a dietary supplement for calcium and magnesium.

Some studies have shown a weak inverse relationship between water hardness and cardiovascular disease in men, up to a level of 170 mg calcium carbonate per litre of water. The World Health Organization has reviewed the evidence and concluded the data was inadequate to allow for a recommendation for a level of hardness.

Recommendations have been made for the maximum and minimum levels of calcium (40–80 ppm) and magnesium (20–30 ppm) in drinking water, and a total hardness expressed as the sum of the calcium and magnesium concentrations of 2–4 mmol/L.

Other studies have shown weak correlations between cardiovascular health and water hardness.

Some studies correlate domestic hard water usage with increased eczema in children.

The Softened-Water Eczema Trial (SWET), a multicenter randomized controlled trial of ion-exchange softeners for treating childhood eczema, was undertaken in 2008. However, no meaningful difference in symptom relief was found between children with access to a home water softener and those without.

Measurement 

Hardness can be quantified by instrumental analysis. The total water hardness is the sum of the molar concentrations of Ca2+ and Mg2+, in mol/L or mmol/L units. Although water hardness usually measures only the total concentrations of calcium and magnesium (the two most prevalent divalent metal ions), iron, aluminium, and manganese can also be present at elevated levels in some locations. The presence of iron characteristically confers a brownish (rust-like) colour to the calcification, instead of white (the color of most of the other compounds).

Water hardness is often not expressed as a molar concentration, but rather in various units, such as degrees of general hardness (dGH), German degrees (°dH), parts per million (ppm, mg/L, or American degrees), grains per gallon (gpg), English degrees (°e, e, or °Clark), or French degrees (°fH, °f or °HF; lowercase f is used to prevent confusion with degrees Fahrenheit). The table below shows conversion factors between the various units.
{| class="wikitable"
|+ Hardness unit conversion.
|-
!  || 1 mmol/L || 1 ppm, mg/L || 1 dGH, °dH || 1 gpg || 1 °e, °Clark || 1 °fH
|-
! mmol/L  
| 1        || 0.009991 || 0.1783   || 0.171    || 0.1424   || 0.09991   
|-
! ppm, mg/L    
| 100.1    || 1        || 17.85    || 17.12    || 14.25    ||10
|-
! dGH, °dH
| 5.608    || 0.05603  || 1        || 0.9591   || 0.7986   || 0.5603    
|-
! gpg     
| 5.847    || 0.05842  || 1.043    || 1        || 0.8327   || 0.5842    
|-
! °e, °Clark
| 7.022    || 0.07016  || 1.252    || 1.201    || 1        || 0.7016    
|-
! °fH     
| 10.01    ||0.1|| 1.785    || 1.712    || 1.425    || 1         
|}
The various alternative units represent an equivalent mass of calcium oxide (CaO) or calcium carbonate (CaCO3) that, when dissolved in a unit volume of pure water, would result in the same total molar concentration of Mg2+ and Ca2+. The different conversion factors arise from the fact that equivalent masses of calcium oxide and calcium carbonates differ, and that different mass and volume units are used. The units are as follows:
 Parts per million (ppm) is usually defined as 1 mg/L CaCO3 (the definition used below). It is equivalent to mg/L without chemical compound specified, and to American degree.
 Grains per Gallon (gpg) is defined as 1 grain (64.8 mg) of calcium carbonate per U.S. gallon (3.79 litres), or 17.118 ppm.
 a mmol/L is equivalent to 100.09 mg/L CaCO3 or 40.08 mg/L Ca2+.
 A degree of General Hardness (dGH or 'German degree (°dH, deutsche Härte))' is defined as 10 mg/L CaO or 17.848 ppm.
 A Clark degree (°Clark) or English degrees (°e or e) is defined as one grain (64.8 mg) of CaCO3 per Imperial gallon (4.55 litres) of water, equivalent to 14.254 ppm.
 A French degree (°fH or °f) is defined as 10 mg/L CaCO3, equivalent to 10 ppm.

Hard/soft classification
As it is the precise mixture of minerals dissolved in the water, together with  water's pH and temperature, that determine the behavior of the hardness, a single-number scale does not adequately describe hardness. However, the United States Geological Survey uses the following classification for hard and soft water:
{| class="wikitable"
|-
! Classification || hardness in mg-CaCO3/L || hardness in mmol/L || hardness in dGH/°dH || hardness in gpg || hardness in ppm
|-
|Soft || 0–60 || 0–0.60 || 0–3.37 || 0–3.50 || 0–60
|-
|Moderately hard || 61–120 || 0.61–1.20 || 3.38–6.74 || 3.56–7.01 || 61–120
|-
|Hard || 121–180 || 1.21–1.80 || 6.75–10.11 || 7.06–10.51 || 121–180
|-
|Very hard || ≥ 181 || ≥ 1.81 || ≥ 10.12 || ≥ 10.57 || ≥ 181
|}
Seawater is considered to be very hard due to various dissolved salts. Typically seawater's hardness is in the area of 6,630 ppm (6.63 grams per litre). In contrast, freshwater has hardness in the range of 15 to 375 ppm.

Indices
Several indices are used to describe the behaviour of calcium carbonate in water, oil, or gas mixtures.

Langelier saturation index (LSI)
The Langelier saturation index (sometimes Langelier stability index) is a calculated number used to predict the calcium carbonate stability of water. It indicates whether the water will precipitate, dissolve, or be in equilibrium with calcium carbonate. In 1936, Wilfred Langelier developed a method for predicting the pH at which water is saturated in calcium carbonate (called pHs). The LSI is expressed as the difference between the actual system pH and the saturation pH:

LSI = pH (measured) − pHs
 For LSI > 0, water is super saturated and tends to precipitate a scale layer of CaCO3.
 For LSI = 0, water is saturated (in equilibrium) with CaCO3. A scale layer of CaCO3 is neither precipitated nor dissolved.
 For LSI < 0, water is under saturated and tends to dissolve solid CaCO3.

If the actual pH of the water is below the calculated saturation pH, the LSI is negative and the water has a very limited scaling potential. If the actual pH exceeds pHs, the LSI is positive, and being supersaturated with CaCO3, the water has a tendency to form scale. At increasing positive index values, the scaling potential increases.

In practice, water with an LSI between −0.5 and +0.5 will not display enhanced mineral dissolving or scale forming properties. Water with an LSI below −0.5 tends to exhibit noticeably increased dissolving abilities while water with an LSI above +0.5 tends to exhibit noticeably increased scale forming properties.

The LSI is temperature sensitive. The LSI becomes more positive as the water temperature increases. This has particular implications in situations where well water is used. The temperature of the water when it first exits the well is often significantly lower than the temperature inside the building served by the well or at the laboratory where the LSI measurement is made. This increase in temperature can cause scaling, especially in cases such as hot water heaters. Conversely, systems that reduce water temperature will have less scaling.
   Water Analysis:
        pH = 7.5
        TDS = 320 mg/L
        Calcium = 150 mg/L (or ppm) as CaCO3
        Alkalinity = 34 mg/L (or ppm) as CaCO3

    LSI formula:
      LSI = pH − pHs
      pHs = (9.3 + A + B) − (C + D) where:
        A =  = 0.15
        B = −13.12 × log10(°C + 273) + 34.55 = 2.09 at 25 °C and 1.09 at 82 °C
        C = log10[Ca2+ as CaCO3] - 0.4 = 1.78         
           (Ca2+ as CaCO3 is also called calcium hardness, and is calculated as 2.5[Ca2+])
        D = log10[alkalinity as CaCO3] = 1.53

Ryznar Stability Index (RSI)
The Ryznar stability index (RSI) uses a database of scale thickness measurements in municipal water systems to predict the effect of water chemistry.

Ryznar saturation index (RSI) was developed from empirical observations of corrosion rates and film formation in steel mains. It is defined as:

RSI = 2 pHs – pH (measured)
 For 6.5 < RSI < 7 water is considered to be approximately at saturation equilibrium with calcium carbonate
 For RSI > 8 water is under saturated and, therefore, would tend to dissolve any existing solid CaCO3
 For RSI < 6.5 water tends to be scale form

Puckorius Scaling Index (PSI)
The Puckorius Scaling Index (PSI) uses slightly different parameters to quantify the relationship between the saturation state of the water and the amount of limescale deposited.

Other indices
Other indices include the Larson-Skold Index, the Stiff-Davis Index, and the Oddo-Tomson Index.

Regional information 
The hardness of local water supplies depends on the source of water. Water in streams flowing over volcanic (igneous) rocks will be soft, while water from boreholes drilled into porous rock is normally very hard.

In Australia 
Analysis of water hardness in major Australian cities by the Australian Water Association shows a range from very soft (Melbourne) to hard (Adelaide).
Total hardness levels of calcium carbonate in ppm are:

Canberra: 40
 Melbourne: 10–26
 Sydney: 39.4–60.1
 Perth: 29–226
 Brisbane: 100
 Adelaide: 134–148
 Hobart: 5.8–34.4
 Darwin: 31

In Canada 
Prairie provinces (mainly Saskatchewan and Manitoba) contain high quantities of calcium and magnesium, often as dolomite, which are readily soluble in the groundwater that contains high concentrations of trapped carbon dioxide from the last glaciation. In these parts of Canada, the total hardness in ppm of calcium carbonate equivalent frequently exceed 200 ppm, if groundwater is the only source of potable water. The west coast, by contrast, has unusually soft water, derived mainly from mountain lakes fed by glaciers and snowmelt.

Some typical values are:
 Montreal 116 ppm
 Calgary 165 ppm
 Regina 496 ppm
 Saskatoon 160–180 ppm
 Winnipeg 77 ppm
 Toronto 121 ppm
 Vancouver < 3 ppm
 Charlottetown, PEI 140–150 ppm
 Waterloo Region 400 ppm
 Guelph 460 ppm
 Saint John (West) 160–200 ppm
 Ottawa 30 ppm

In England and Wales 

Information from the British Drinking Water Inspectorate shows that drinking water in England is generally considered to be 'very hard', with most areas of England, particularly east of a line between the Severn and Tees estuaries, exhibiting above 200 ppm for the calcium carbonate equivalent. Water in London, for example, is mostly obtained from the River Thames and River Lea both of which derive significant proportion of their dry weather flow from springs in limestone and chalk aquifers. Wales, Devon, Cornwall and parts of northwest England are softer water areas, and range from 0 to 200 ppm. In the brewing industry in England and Wales, water is often deliberately hardened with gypsum in the process of Burtonisation.

Generally water is mostly hard in urban areas of England where soft water sources are unavailable. A number of cities built water supply sources in the 18th century as the industrial revolution and urban population burgeoned. Manchester was a notable such city in North West England and its wealthy corporation built a number of reservoirs at Thirlmere and Haweswater in the Lake District to the north. There is no exposure to limestone or chalk in their headwaters and consequently the water in Manchester is rated as 'very soft'. Similarly, tap water in Birmingham is also soft as it is sourced from the Elan Valley Reservoirs in Wales, even though groundwater in the area is hard.

In Ireland 
The EPA has published a standards handbook for the interpretation of water quality in Ireland in which definitions of water hardness are given.
In this section, reference to original EU documentation is given, which sets out no limit for hardness. In turn, the handbook also gives no "Recommended or Mandatory Limit Values" for hardness. The handbooks does indicate that above the midpoint of the ranges defined as "Moderately Hard", effects are seen increasingly: "The chief disadvantages of hard waters are that they neutralise the lathering power of soap[...] and, more important, that they can cause blockage of pipes and severely reduced boiler efficiency because of scale formation. These effects will increase as the hardness rises to and beyond 200 mg/L ."

In the United States 
A collection of data from the United States found that about half the water stations tested had hardness over 120 mg per litre of calcium carbonate equivalent, placing them in the categories "hard" or "very hard". The other half were classified as soft or moderately hard. More than 85% of American homes have hard water. The softest waters occur in parts of the New England, South Atlantic-Gulf, Pacific Northwest, and Hawaii regions. Moderately hard waters are common in many of the rivers of the Tennessee, Great Lakes, and Alaska regions. Hard and very hard waters are found in some of the streams in most of the regions throughout the country. The hardest waters (greater than 1,000 ppm) are in streams in Texas, New Mexico, Kansas, Arizona, Utah, parts of Colorado, southern Nevada, and southern California.

See also 

 Fouling
 Water purification
 Water quality
 Water treatment

References

External links
 
 
 
Describes a procedure for determining the hardness of water using EDTA with Eriochrome indicator

Water
Forms of water
Liquid water
Limestone